Journal of College Counseling is a quarterly peer-reviewed academic journal published by Wiley-Blackwell on behalf of the American Counseling Association and the American College Counseling Association.  The journal was established in 1998.  Its current editor-in-chief is Joshua C. Watson. The journal focuses on college counseling research and the practice of counselors working in higher education settings.

References

External links 
 

Wiley-Blackwell academic journals
English-language journals
Publications established in 1998
Psychotherapy journals